Jesús Alexandre González Emerson (born February 26, 1992, in San Jose, California), known as Alex González Emerson, is an American professional association football (soccer) player who plays for C.D. Tepatitlán de Morelos.

References

External links
 

Liga MX players
Living people
American soccer players
1992 births
Soccer players from San Jose, California
Association footballers not categorized by position